Alabama Legislative Black Caucus v. Alabama, 135 S. Ct. 1257 (2015), was a U.S. Supreme Court decision that overturned a previous decision by a federal district court upholding Alabama's 2012 redrawing of its electoral districts. The Alabama legislature had focused on reducing the difference in population between the districts to 1% or less, while keeping the same proportion of minority voters in each district. The Alabama Legislative Black Caucus and Alabama Democratic Conference challenged this on the grounds that it was an illegal racial gerrymander, banned under the Equal Protection Clause of the Fourteenth Amendment. 

The case went before a three-judge panel in federal district court. The panel characterized the arguments of the Caucus and the Conference as challenging the Alabama redistricting as a whole, with the Conference additionally challenging four specific Senate districts: 7, 11, 22, and 26. The panel held that the Caucus had standing for its claim, but dismissed the Conference's claims regarding both the state as a whole and the four districts. The Court further held that race was not the predominant factor for the redistricting as a whole or for the four districts. Finally, the panel held that, even if it was wrong and race was the predominant factor for the redistricting, the districts should still survive strict scrutiny because the act creating them was narrowly tailored to achieve the compelling state interest of avoiding racial retrogression which would prevent minority voters from electing their candidate of choice.

The Supreme Court, in a 5-4 opinion written by Justice Stephen Breyer, overturned the District Court decision. It held that racial gerrymandering claims must be considered district-by-district, rather than by looking at the state as a whole. The court may consider statewide evidence in evaluating these claims, but the complaint and remedy must concern a particular district or subset of districts. The opinion also held that the Conference had standing to bring its claims. The Court further held that equaling population between the districts is assumed to be a goal of any redistricting effort, and that a finding that the legislature was trying to equal the district population is not sufficient to dismiss claims that the legislature improperly considered race when drawing district lines. Finally, the Court rejected Alabama's claim that Section Five of the Voting Rights Act of 1965 compelled them to maintain the same percentage of minority voters in each district. Section Five only bars legislative action that would diminish the ability of a minority group to elect their candidate of choice. The Court then vacated the previous holding of the District Court and remanded the case for further consideration.

References

External links
 

United States Supreme Court cases
United States Supreme Court cases of the Roberts Court
2015 in United States case law
Alabama Legislature
United States electoral redistricting case law
Legal history of Alabama
Gerrymandering in the United States
African-American history of Alabama